Pargitaguse is a village in Jõhvi Parish, Ida-Viru County in northeastern Estonia. It is located just southeast of the town of Jõhvi and northeast of Ahtme district of Kohtla-Järve. As of 1 January 2011 the settlement's population was 77.

References

Villages in Ida-Viru County